The Lark on the Wing is a 1950 children's novel by Elfrida Vipont. A sequel to her 1948 The Lark in the Morn, it was published by Oxford University Press.

Synopsis
After Kit Haverard's father dies, leaving her destitute, she follows her dream of becoming a professional singer.

Reception
The Lark on the Wing won the Carnegie Medal for books published in 1950.

Kirkus Reviews considered that Kit's "growth as a woman and as a singer is developed with the same warmth that runs through the first book" and noted the character of singing instructor Papa Andreas as being "particularly rememberable", observing that the "characters tower over the events in their isolated lives."

References

External links
The Lark on the Wing at WorldCat

Carnegie Medal in Literature winning works
Oxford University Press books
1950 children's books